Büyükkösebalcı is a village in Tarsus district of Mersin Province, Turkey. It is situated in the peneplane area to the south of Taurus Mountains and to the north of Berdan Dam reservoir. The population of Büyükkösebalcı was 253 as of 2011.

References

Villages in Tarsus District